Stanisław vel Moskal Ziemiański (April 7, 1892 in Kraków – July 10, 1965 in Kraków) – was a Polish footballer and referee. During his career he played in Wisła Kraków (1911–1921) and Cracovia (1913). Later he worked as referee.

Bibliography 

Polish footballers
Wisła Kraków players
MKS Cracovia (football) players
1892 births
1965 deaths
Footballers from Kraków
Association football midfielders